Mimotetrorea spinipennis is a species of beetle in the family Cerambycidae, and the only species in the genus Mimotetrorea. It was described by Breuning in 1973.

References

Apomecynini
Beetles described in 1973
Monotypic beetle genera